Dial Post is a village in the Horsham District of West Sussex, England. It has a population of around 100 based on the average headcount per inhabited dwelling. In 2001 the population of the civil parish as a whole was 2,934

History
The origin of the name is uncertain, Dial Post house, a large building dated 1712 post-dates the name of settlement as do Dial Post farm and Dial Post fields which were named in the early 18th century. Dial Post farm comprised  in c. 1710 when it was leased for 21 years. A public house, the Crown, is recorded as having been established as early as the 1870s.

The ruins of medieval Knepp Castle lie between Dial Post and Southwater by the A24.

The first house was built in the late 1500s and was next to 3 other houses. In the Victorian era the hamlet had a village shop.

Geography

Today

There is one public house, the Crown, but no church or shops.

The village centre retains four of the area's listed buildings, all of Grade II:
New Lodge
Hazel Cottage
Alma Cottage
Dial Post House

A new village hall, built with the help of a £50,000 grant from the Sussex Downs and Low Weald LEADER programme, was completed early in 2010.

The ecclesiastical parish centres on an ancient Grade I listed church, St George in the middle of West Grinstead The parishioners have undertaken to maintain the chancel in exchange for the grant from the glebe estate in 1511 of the church house, see chancel repair liability.  Similarly, across that village centre is the listed Catholic Church of our Lady of Consolation and St Francis.

Transport
Dial Post was originally on the main but picturesque A24 road linking London, Epsom, Leatherhead, Horsham and Worthing, between Southwater and Ashington, but a straighter bypass exists to the east.

References

External links

Villages in West Sussex
Horsham District